Pamela Golbin is a French curator, author and fashion historian. From 1993 to 2018 she was the chief curator of fashion and textile at the Musée des Arts Décoratifs in Paris. In 2019 she became artistic director of the Jacquard artist's residency.

Career 
Golbin attended Columbia University in the City of New York and La Sorbonne in Paris, specializing in Post-World War II Abstract Expressionism. During her studies, Golbin was part of the apprenticeship program at The Metropolitan Museum of Art and worked at The Costume Institute. Concurrently, she pursued a similar program at the Musée de la Mode et du Textile in Paris where, following her studies, she was named curator at the age of 23. During her 25-year tenure at the museum, Golbin “helped shape the artistic sensibility in the industry”.

Simultaneously from 2008 to 2013 in New York City, she initiated and developed the French Institute Alliance Française (FIAF) Annual Fashion Talks. In 2018, she attended the Executive Education management program at Harvard Business School.

In 2019, Golbin was named artistic director of the Jacquard x Google Arts & Culture Residency which aims to explore the synergies between art, fashion, and technology.

Golbin collaborates closely with contemporary designers and international creative talents. John Galliano describes her as “an incomparable source of inspiration, a true well of science. Valentino Garavani admitted, “She knows more about my own work than I do” and Dries Van Noten remarks, “She has incredible sensitivity and flair”. The Financial Times wrote about her stating, “As the chief curator of fashion and textiles at Paris’s Musée des Arts Décoratifs, Pamela Golbin is the custodian of the history of French taste”.The Business of Fashion accurately identifies the personalities influencing an industry in constant evolution, integrating her within their yearly classification of 500 of the most influential people shaping the fashion industry, Pamela Golbin is in charge “of one of the most significant and extensive collections of fashion and textiles in the world”.

Golbin is considered for her work as a historian and curator. “Just as the discipline of architecture boasts its cast of “starchitects”, this critical re-presentation of fashion has been led by a roll call of “It” curators that includes Andrew Bolton of the Costume Institute at the Metropolitan Museum of Art, New York; Valerie Steele of the Museum of the Fashion Institute of Technology, New York; and Pamela Golbin of the Musée de la Mode et du Textile, Paris”

She has been described by the press as “the brains behind the Louvre’s blockbuster fashion exhibitions, Pamela Golbin, is one of the industry’s most influential people you’ve never heard of”. In fact, until she stepped down as chief curator in 2018, her exhibitions saw “hundreds of thousands of visitors every year”

Of her exhibits, fashion critic Suzy Menkes wrote, "Madeleine Vionnet, Puriste de la Mode’ is an intelligent and illuminating exhibition and an example of excellence from its curator, Pamela Golbin". Or "Balenciaga Paris" is the first major exhibition of Cristóbal Balenciaga held in his adopted city, and its curator, Pamela Golbin, has brought a fine intelligence to clothes that could seem so dissonant in the age of the Internet”

Selected books
  Couture Confessions, Rizzoli, 2016
 Fashion Forward, 300 Years of Fashion, Rizzoli, 2016
 Paris: Les Boulevards, Rizzoli, 2014
 Dries Van Noten, Inspirations, Lanoo, 2014 
 Fashion Icons, 2014
 Louis Vuitton Marc Jacobs, Rizzoli, 2012
 Hussein Chalayan, Rizzoli, 2011 
 Madeleine Vionnet: Puriste de la Mode, Rizzoli, 2009
 Valentino, Thèmes et Variations, Rizzoli, 2008
 Balenciaga Paris, Thames et Hudson, 2006
  Fashion Designers,  Watson & Guptill, 2000

Selected exhibitions 
(non-exhaustive list)

References 

Living people
Fashion historians
Chevaliers of the Ordre des Arts et des Lettres
Year of birth missing (living people)
French women historians
French curators
French women curators